Edgartown is a census-designated place (CDP) comprising the primary settlement in the town of Edgartown, Dukes County, Massachusetts, United States, on the island of Martha's Vineyard. The CDP also includes the neighborhood of Clevelandtown.

Edgartown was first listed as a CDP after the 2010 census with a population of 1,107

Demographics

2020 census

Note: the US Census treats Hispanic/Latino as an ethnic category. This table excludes Latinos from the racial categories and assigns them to a separate category. Hispanics/Latinos can be of any race.

References 

Census-designated places in Dukes County, Massachusetts
Census-designated places in Massachusetts